Bertil Jonasson  (12 January 1918 – 15 June 2011) was a Swedish politician. He was a member of the Centre Party. Jonassson was a member of the Parliament of Sweden between 1958 and 1988. Jonasson died in June 2011.

References

Members of the Riksdag from the Centre Party (Sweden)
1918 births
2011 deaths
Members of the Första kammaren
20th-century Swedish politicians